Cheng Cheng-chien (born 31 May 1969) is a Taiwanese politician. He was a member of the Hsinchu City Council from 2002 to 2020, when he was elected to the Legislative Yuan.

Early life and education
Cheng was born on 31 May 1969, in Hsinchu, and graduated from National Hsinchu Senior High School. He studied journalism and diplomacy at National Chengchi University and completed a master's degree within the university's Graduate Institute of East Asian Studies, followed by doctoral study at Chung Hua University. He has taught as an assistant professor at Chung Hua University and Hsuan Chuang University.

Political career
Cheng served on the Hsinchu City Council from 2002 to 2020. He won his first election to the body as a Kuomintang candidate. Chen was listed as an independent candidate in the 2005 local elections, and returned to the Kuomintang for the 2009 election cycle. Cheng retained his seat in 2014 and 2018, running both times under the Kuomintang banner.

Cheng contested a Legislative Yuan seat in Hsinchu during the 2004 legislative election as an independent candidate, and was not seated. He ran as the Kuomintang candidate in the Hsinchu City Constituency during the 2016 legislative election, after defeating  in a party primary. He faced New Power Party candidate Chiu Hsien-chih and Democratic Progressive Party incumbent Ker Chien-ming. The Democratic Progressive Party suspected Cheng of buying votes during a banquet hosted by the Hsinchu City chapter of the Kuomintang in December 2015, as he attended the event while wearing a vest promoting his campaign. Subsequently, the Hsinchu District Prosecutors’ Office began an investigation into the banquet. The Democratic Progressive Party then filed a lawsuit against Kuomintang chair Eric Chu at the Taipei District Prosecutors' Office related to alleged vote buying at the banquet. The vote buying allegations became a topic of discussion during the second televised presidential debate between Chu and Tsai Ing-wen. During his unsuccessful 2016 campaign, pamphlets distributed by Cheng's supporters were confiscated by Hsinchu police. Though Cheng protested the confiscation, the Hsinchu District Prosecutors' office stated that the pamphlets merited further investigation, as they contained distortions about and sensationalist allegations against Ker Chien-ming. 

During his 2020 campaign, Cheng drew attention to a perceived double standard, stating that he had been labeled a pro-China candidate by the Democratic Progressive Party, but that his opponent  used the term "Taiwan, China" while establishing a business in China, only to campaign on a promise to "Protect Taiwan". Cheng Cheng-chien was elected to the 10th Legislative Yuan, and became a member of the legislature's Education and Culture Committee. In July 2020, New Power Party chair Hsu Yung-ming asked Cheng to step down from that role, as Huang Kuo-chang accused Cheng of plagiarizing a portion of his doctoral thesis.

References

1969 births
Living people
Members of the 10th Legislative Yuan
Hsinchu Members of the Legislative Yuan
Kuomintang Members of the Legislative Yuan in Taiwan
National Chengchi University alumni
People involved in plagiarism controversies
Taiwanese city councilors